Papernaia is a subgenus of the genus Plasmodium, all of which are parasitic protozoa. The subgenus was created in 2010 by Landau et al.

Species in this subgenus infect birds with malaria.


Subgenus characteristics

The gametocytes are elongated. The schizonts apically or lateroapically placed and are rounded or irregularly shaped. The host nucleus may be tilted.

History

This subgenus was created on the basis of morphology. It may be subsequently revised when more information becomes available from DNA studies.

It was created to deal with the existing problems with the existing subgenera Giovannolaia and Novyella. Both genera were originally defined on the basis of morphology but subsequent DNA analysis showed them both to be polyphetic. These subgenera have been revised and several of the species originally placed within those subgenera have now been moved to Papernaia.

The name of this subgenus was chosen to honour the malariologist Ilan Paperna.

References

Plasmodium subgenera
Parasites of birds